Under the Ottoman Empire, an askeri (Ottoman Turkish: عسكري) was a member of a class of military administrators.

This elite class consisted of three main groups: the military, the court officials, and clergy.  Though the term askeri itself literally means "of the military", it more broadly encompassed all higher levels of imperial administration.  To become a member of this ruling elite, one thus had to hold a political office in the service of the Ottoman Empire, meaning that both Muslims and non-Muslims in those positions could rank as askeri.

After Napoleon  invaded Ottoman Egypt in 1798, a reform movement in the regime of Sultan Selim III aimed to reduce the numbers of the askeri class, who were the first-class citizens or military class (also called Janissaries).

Sultan Selim III was taken prisoner (1807) and murdered (1808) in the course of  Janissary revolts. A subsequent sultan, Mahmud II, was patient but remembered the results of the uprising in 1807. In June 1826 he caused a revolt among the Janissaries, kept them all in their barracks and slaughtered thousands of them.

The askeris stood in contrast with the reaya, the tax-paying lower class, and with the kul, or slave class, which included the Janissaries.

See also
 Rayah

References

Politics of the Ottoman Empire
Military of the Ottoman Empire
Social classes in the Ottoman Empire